Laur, officially the Municipality of Laur (Ilocano: Ili ti Laur), is a 3rd class municipality in the province of Nueva Ecija in Central Luzon region of Philippines. According to the 2020 census, it has a population of 38,263 people.. Laur is located at the foothills of the Sierra Madre Mountains.

Etymology
The town got its name after the name of the wife of Gen. Manuel Tino, Laureana.

History
Originally, the town was a barrio of the municipality of Bongabon, named San Esteban, after its patron saint, Stephen I of Hungary.

On January 13, 1917, via Executive Order No. 98 by then Governor-General Francis Burton Harrison, Laur was separated as its own town from Bongabon, and named from the wife of Gen. Manuel Tinio, Laureana. Gen. Tinio himself will have the town of Papaya named after him, as "General Tinio" in 1957. Laur borders General Tinio to the south.

Senators Benigno Aquino, Jr. and Jose W. Diokno were kept in solitary confinement for exactly thirty days in 1973 within Fort Magsaysay in Laur. It is now a museum and houses the AFP Center for Human Rights Dialogue.

Geography

Barangays
Laur is politically subdivided into 17 barangays.

Climate

Demographics

Economy

Government
Past Mayors of Laur are as follows:
1. Pedro Panginen (1917-1919)
2. Nemesio Peralta (1919-1922)
3. Teodoro Manglicmot (1922-1925
4. Timoteo De Guzman (1925-1928)
5. Pedro Aquino (1928-1931)
6. Florentino Pascua (1931-1934)
7. Timoteo De Guzman (1934-1937)
8. Tomas Arenas (1938-1940)
9. Ladisslao Aquino (Nov. 20-Dec. 21, 1940)
10. Felix Petines (1940-1941)
11. Jose Villavisa (1946-1951)
12. Jorge Padilla (1952-1955)
13. Manuel Mesina (1956-1963)
14. Gabriel Daus (1964-1971)
15. Nicolas Abad (1972-1979)
16. Gabriel Daus (1979-1986)
17. Antonio Tolentino (1986-1998)
18. Blas Canlas (1998-2007)
19. Alvaro Daus (2007-2016)
20. Alexander Daus (2016-2022)
21. Christopher Daus (2022-Incumbent)

See also
 Philippine Carabao Center

References

External links

 [ Philippine Standard Geographic Code]
Philippine Census Information
Local Governance Performance Management System

Municipalities of Nueva Ecija